Premio Lo Nuestro 2007 was held on Thursday, February 22, 2007, at the American Airlines Arena in Miami, Florida. It was broadcast live by Univision Network. The nominees were announced on December 12, 2006, during a press conference televised live on the Univision Network morning show Despierta América!.

Host
Cristián de la Fuente
Ninel Conde

Performers
Menudo

Presenters
Alejandra Guzman
Alicia Machado
Alondra
Anais
Andres Cepeda
Armando Araiza
Babasonicos
Don Dinero
Galilea Montijo
Guy Ecker
Jaqueline Bracamontes
Jennifer Lopez
Julieta Venegas
Kika Edgar
Laisha Wilkins
Lili Estefan
la Quinta Estacion
Mana
Rafael Mercadante
Rakim & Ken-Y
Victor Noriega

Kika Edgar

Laisha Wilkins

Special awards

Premio Lo Nuestro a la Excelencia (Lifetime Achievement Award)
 Juan Luis Guerra

Pop

Album of the Year
 Adentro, Ricardo Arjona
 Días Felices, Cristian Castro
 El Sexto Sentido: Re+Loaded, Thalía
 Mañana, Sin Bandera
 Nuestro Amor, RBD

Male Artist
 Chayanne
 Cristian Castro
 Luis Fonsi
 Ricardo Arjona

Female Artist
 Anaís
 Julieta Venegas
 Laura Pausini
 Shakira

Group or Duo
 La 5ª Estación
 RBD
 Reik
 Sin Bandera

Song of the Year
 Amor Eterno, Cristian Castro
 No, no, no, Thalía & Anthony "Romeo" Santos of Aventura
 Por Una Mujer, Luis Fonsi
 Que Me Alcance la Vida, Sin Bandera
 Te Echo de Menos, Chayanne

Breakout Artist or Group of the Year
 Anaís
 Camila
 Chelo
 Yuridia

Rock

Album of the Year
 Amar es Combatir, Maná
 Anoche, Babasónicos
 Indeleble, Alejandra Guzmán
 Pecado Original, Enanitos Verdes
 Vida de Perros, Los Bunkers

Artist of the Year
 Alejandra Guzmán
 Babasónicos
 Juanes
 Maná

Song of the Year
 Carismático, Babasónicos
 Labios Compartidos, Maná
 Lo Que Me Gusta a Mí, Juanes
 Mariposas, Enanitos Verdes
 Volverte a Amar, Alejandra Guzmán

Tropical

Album of the Year
 Decisión Unánime, Víctor Manuelle
 Éxitos y Más, Monchy y Alexandra
 I Love Salsa! - Edición Especial, N'Klabe
 Sigo Siendo Yo, Marc Anthony
 Soy Diferente, India

Male Artist of the Year
 Andy Andy
 Fonseca
 Marc Anthony
 Tito Nieves

Female Artist of the Year
 Gisselle
 India
 Milly Quezada
 Olga Tañón

Group or Duo of the Year
 Aventura
 India & Cheka
 Monchy y Alexandra
 N'Klabe & Víctor Manuelle
 N'Klabe & Voltio

Song of the Year
 Tu Amor Me Hace Bien, Marc Anthony
 Amor de Una Noche, N'Klabe with Voltio
 No Es Una Novela, Monchy y Alexandra
 Nuestro Amor Se Ha Vuelto Ayer, Víctor Manuelle
 Te Mando Flores, Fonseca

Merengue Artist of the Year
 Grupo Manía
 Limi-T 21
 Olga Tañón
 Chichi Peralta

Tropical Salsa Artist of the Year
 Marc Anthony
 Michael Stuart
 Tito Nieves
 Víctor Manuelle

Tropical Traditional Artist of the Year
 Andy Andy
 Aventura
 Fonseca
 Monchy y Alexandra

New Soloist or Group of the Year
 Fonseca
 Marlon
 Orlando Conga

Regional Mexican Music

Album of the Year
 Algo de Mi, Conjunto Primavera
 Aliado del Tiempo, Mariano Barba
 Borrón y Cuenta Nueva, Grupo Montéz de Durango
 Historias que Contar, Los Tigres del Norte
 Los Super Éxitos, Grupo Montéz de Durango

Male Artist of the Year
 El Chapo de Sinaloa
 Joan Sebastian
 Mariano Barba
 Sergio Vega

Female Artist of the Year
 Alicia Villarreal
 Diana Reyes
 Graciela Beltrán
 Jenni Rivera

Group or Duo of the Year
 Conjunto Primavera
 Grupo Montéz de Durango
 Intocable
 Los Tigres del Norte

Song of the Year
 Aliado del Tiempo, Mariano Barba
 Algo de Mí, Conjunto Primavera
 Alguien te Va a Hacer Llorar, Intocable
 De Contrabando, Jenni Rivera
 Lagrimillas Tontas, Grupo Montéz de Durango

Banda Artist of the Year
 Mariano Barba
 Beto y sus Canarios
 Jenni Rivera
 Joan Sebastian

Duranguense Artist of the Year
 Alacranes Musical
 Grupo Montéz de Durango
 K-Paz de la Sierra
 Patrulla 81

Grupera Artist of the Year
 Bronco - El Gigante De América
 Grupo Bryndis
 Los Temerarios
 Victor Garcia

Norteño Artist of the Year
 Conjunto Primavera
 Intocable
 Los Huracanes del Norte
 Los Tigres del Norte

Ranchera Artist of the Year
 Alicia Villarreal
 Pablo Montero
 Pepe Aguilar
 Vicente Fernández

Tejano Artist of the Year
 Bobby Pulido
 Costumbre
 Jimmy González

New Soloist or Group of the Year
 Los Creadorez del Pasito Duranguense de Alfredo Ramírez
 Los Cuen's de Sinaloa
 Chelín Ortiz

Urban

Album of the Year
 Barrio Fino en Directo, Daddy Yankee
 Flashback, Ivy Queen
 Masterpriece, R.K.M & Ken-Y
 Pa'l Mundo: Deluxe Edition, Wisin & Yandel
 Top of the Line, Tito El Bambino

Artist of the Year
 Daddy Yankee
 Don Omar
 Tito El Bambino
 Wisin & Yandel

Song of the Year
 Caile, Tito El Bambino
 Down, R.K.M & Ken-Y
 Llamé Pa' Verte, Wisin & Yandel
 Machucando, Daddy Yankee
 Rompe, Daddy Yankee

Video of the Year
 Todos me Miran, Gloria Trevi
 Labios Compartidos, Maná
 Me voy, Julieta Venegas
 Mojado, Ricardo Arjona with Intocable
 Ni Freud Ni Tu Mama, Belinda

References

Lo Nuestro Awards by year
2007 music awards
2007 in Florida
2007 in Latin music
2000s in Miami